Lars Løkken Østli (born November 21, 1986) is a Norwegian former professional ice hockey defenceman. He played for Storhamar Dragons of the Norwegian GET-ligaen.

References

External links

Living people
Luleå HF players
Storhamar Dragons players
1986 births
Norwegian expatriate ice hockey people
Norwegian expatriate sportspeople in Sweden
Sportspeople from Hamar
Norwegian ice hockey defencemen